Orocrambus lewisi is a moth in the family Crambidae. It was described by David E. Gaskin in 1975. It is endemic to New Zealand, where it has been recorded from the South Island, Stephens Island and the south-west tip of the North Island.

The wingspan is 28–30 mm. The forewings are yellow brown with a white median streak, bordered by dark brown. The hindwings are shining brownish white. Adults have been recorded from October to March.

The larvae feed on Poa cita (formerly Poa caespitosa).

References

Crambinae
Moths of New Zealand
Moths described in 1975
Endemic fauna of New Zealand
Endemic moths of New Zealand